"Symptom of the Universe" is a song by British heavy metal band Black Sabbath from their 1975 album Sabotage. The song was an influence on the development of thrash metal.

Overview
"Symptom of the Universe" was composed largely by guitarist Tony Iommi, with lyrics by Geezer Butler. Its closing passage, very unlike the rest of the song, evolved from an in-studio jam, created spontaneously in a single day.

Live versions can be heard on the albums Past Lives, Cross Purposes Live and Live... Gathered in Their Masses, as well as the Never Say Die! concert video. It is also the opening track on Ozzy Osbourne's 1982 live album, Speak of the Devil.

"Symptom of the Universe" was ranked the 19th-best Black Sabbath song by Rock - Das Gesamtwerk der größten Rock-Acts im Check.

Musical style
The main riff to "Symptom of the Universe" is considered to be a structural and sonic predecessor to thrash metal, a heavy metal subgenre which emerged in the early 1980s. Tony Iommi said of the song "It starts with an acoustic bit. Then it goes into the up-tempo stuff to give it that dynamic, and it does have a lot of changes to it, including the jam at the end."

Notable covers
 Brazilian band Sepultura recorded a cover of the song in 1994 for the Black Sabbath tribute album Nativity in Black. That recording was later included on the band's 1997 album Blood-Rooted.
 Helmet recorded a version for the soundtrack of The Jerky Boys: The Movie. In the film, Helmet are featured as a club band with Ozzy Osbourne guest-starring as their manager.
 Candlemass covered the song as part of a Black Sabbath medley on their 1988 album Ancient Dreams.
 Pop Will Eat Itself used a sample in their song 'Familus Horribilus' on their 1994 album Dos Dedos Mis Amigos.

Personnel
 Ozzy Osbourne – vocals
 Tony Iommi – electric and acoustic guitars
 Geezer Butler – bass
 Bill Ward – drums, bongos, claves

References

1975 singles
Black Sabbath songs
Songs written by Ozzy Osbourne
Songs written by Tony Iommi
Songs written by Geezer Butler
Songs written by Bill Ward (musician)
1975 songs
British heavy metal songs